(full name) is a Christian association within the Church of Sweden. The organization was an "informal or semi-official national school board" prior to the founding of Sweden's public education system and made a significant impact on Sweden's early education system.

History 
After a nine-year position as pastor of Gloria Dei Church in Philadelphia, in which he had "been preparing the way for Methodism in Philadelphia" and contact with Methodist John Wesley, he felt the necessity to found an organization to "[propagate] practical religion", with a promise of support from Wesley. Its motto was "A society, which with utmost diligence should promote the growth and spread of Christianity in the Kingdom of Sweden". The society, with its Pietist influence, was to serve as a platform for the spread of Christian faith and knowledge through the ideas of Christian enlightenment, education, mission and temperance during its early years, as well as a counter to neology in the state church. It has been called Sweden's first missionary and tract society. Its goal was to "work against the decline of Christian knowledge and civic virtues".

At a time when the view of the state and its responsibilities did not allow for state intervention in public education and enlightenment, the society carried out voluntarily what it considered the time required, but which the state was unable to carry out. Its ideas later became generally accepted and were gradually taken over in part by other organizations. The society is thus the earliest surviving example of how Swedish civil society began to take shape.

The society's work was divided into two divisions, the education division and the pastoral or catechism division. It grew quickly in the beginning, with 76 members in the first year, 23 of whom lived in Finland and Pomerania and 28 in other countries. Expenses were paid partly by voluntary contributions from members (after 1819, annual fees were paid by each member) and partly by quite substantial donations.

Education 
The society became a pioneer in public education in Sweden, advocating for education covering both religious and broad general subjects at a time when most parish schools provided a basic education. It rewarded teachers and helped found libraries. In 1777 the society established a total of five catechist schools in Stockholm to provide Christian education "to persons over 15 years of age who do not have adequate knowledge of Christianity, and to children who, accepted for service in factories or in handicrafts, or for whatever reasons lack the opportunity for daily schooling". The schools were intended to compensate for inadequate home schooling. A number of clergy positions, younger priests, were employed as teachers at these schools and known as catechists.

In addition, from 1841, classes were established for older children who could not read, eventually reaching a total of six. In 1875 they were discontinued. After the discontinuation of the school, the catechism classes were composed mostly of developmentally disabled children, who were prepared for their first Communion.

Over the years, the catechism division underwent modernization in various ways, but survived and was transferred to the Stockholm parish delegate in 1965.

Publishing 
Early on, the society focused on publishing Christian literature and tracts and supporting the distribution of Christian scripture, either on its own or through other means. It was inspired by the work of the British Society for the Diffusion of Useful Knowledge and Society for the Propagation of the Gospel in Foreign Parts.

One of the society's main tasks was to provide textbooks: there was a need for textbooks covering a broad range of subjects for popular education. For a long time efforts were made to produce a new catechism; this attempt, however, ran aground.

The scripture committee awarded prizes to encourage good contributions on contemporary religious questions, and distributed short, easy-to-read sermons ("Sunday Friends") to those whose occupations prevented them from attending Sunday worship, such as carriage and tram drivers, to meet the spiritual needs of these workers. The committee also published "Guides to the study of the New Testament", prepared by a number of young priests, for Bible study especially in church youth associations.

Pro Fide et Christianismo published material on what they saw as the issues of the day, including "declining church attendance and communion frequency ... growing deism and atheism ... extravagance in food and drink ... and 'enthusiasm'". Religious biographic portrayals, such as deathbed conversion stories, including of a Sami girl were also published – in which case the complete account was not published due to the controversy of portraying a person's last moments.

The society published books by Johann Arndt, Martin Luther, Peter Fjellstedt, Hans Magnus Melin, and others.

In the 1940s, the society published a new translation of the Lutheran Book of Concord.

Impact 
Pro Fide et Christianismo initiated the founding of several societies: the Swedish Missionary Society, the Swedish Bible Society, the Exchange Teaching Society, the Society for the Diffusion of Useful Knowledge, and, at least indirectly, provided the impetus for the establishment of normal schools. The society also contributed to the founding of the Regina School in Anjala, Finland, one of the country's first public schools – as well as its library, the first in Finland.

Today 
Today, the society's main task is to provide financial support for the publication and dissemination of Christian literature. It financially supports the Nordic peer-reviewed academic journal Theofilos. It also awards scholarships to students of theology. It has approximately 200 members. Pro Fide et Christianismo is Sweden's oldest existing Christian association.

Members 
Members of the organization include:

 Abraham Bäck
 Carl Jesper Benzelius 
 Bernhard von Beskow
 Einar Billing
 Ebbe Gustaf Bring
 Anders Chydenius
 Matthias Calonius
 Karl Fredrik Dahlgren
 Frans Michael Franzén
 Anders Fryxell
 Jakob Gadolin
 Erik Gustaf Geijer
 Erik Laxmann
 
 Jakob Tengström
 Carl Fredrik Mennander
 
 

Honorary members include Henry Muehlenberg, John Wesley, and Arne Fjellbu.

Presidents 
The current president is professor Oloph Bexell. Presidents of the society have included the following, in addition to its founder Carl Magnus Wrangel:

 bishop 
 privy council member 
 bishop 
 priest of the royal court 
 chancellor of justice 
 archbishop Uno von Troil
 privy council member 
  (bishop appointed by the king) 
 bishop Olof Wallquist
 bishop Gustaf Murray
 bishop 
 prime minister of justice Mattias Rosenblad
  
 secretary of state Nils von Rosenstein
 bishop 
 archbishop Johan Olof Wallin
 archbishop Carl Fredrik af Wingård
 pastor primarius Carl Peter Hagberg
 pastor primarius 
 pastor primarius 
 education minister 
  
 vicar 
 education minister Nils Claëson
 pastor primarius 
 vicar 
 supreme court justice 
 priest of the royal court 
 bishop Helge Ljungberg
 dean 
 priest of the royal court 
 professor Oloph Bexell (sv)

References

Notes

Sources

Further reading 

 O. Bexell, "Roos i Sverige och om Samfundet Pro Fides historia." Kyrka, kultur historia – en festskrift till Johnny Hagberg. (Skara, 2012).
 C.H. Levin, Samfundet Pro Fide et Christianismo. (Ett hundraårigt minnesblad vid samfundets jubelfest den 27 mars 1871). (Stockholm, 1871).
 D. Lindmark: "De Fide Historica: Societas Suecana Pro Fide et Christianismo and the Religious Exemplary Biography in Sweden, 1771-1780", in Confessional Sanctity, ed. Jürgen Beyer et al. (Veröffentlichungen des Instituts für Europäische Geschichte Mainz. Beiheft 51.) (Mainz, 2003).
 D. Lindmark: "Samfundet Pro Fide et Christianismo och den kyrkliga folkundervisningen" i Sveriges kyrkohistoria 5, Individualismens och upplysningens tid pub. by Harry Lenhammar (Stockholm, 2000).
 R. Murray: Samfundet Pro Fide under 200 år (Stockholm, 1971).
 S. Nilsson, Samfundet Pro Fide et Christianismo. Minnesskrift med anledning av dess etthundrafemtioårsjubileum. (Stockholm, 1921).
 A. Parkman: "Hofprediger Wrangel und die Societas Svecana Pro Fide et Christianismo", i Pietismus und Neuzeit. Ein Jahrbuch zur Geschichte des neueren Protestantismus, Vol. 7 (1981).

External links 

 

Religious organizations established in 1771
Church of Sweden
Clubs and societies in Sweden
Book publishing companies of Sweden